The 2006 FIBA World Championship squads were the squads of the 2006 FIBA World Championship.  The list includes the 12-men rosters of the 24 participating countries, totaling 288 players.

Group A

Argentina

Head coach: Sergio Hernández

France

Head coach: Claude Bergeaud

NB: Diarra replaced Tony Parker, who suffered a broken finger, just before the 24-hour deadline for submitting final squads.

Lebanon

Head coach: Paul Coughter

Nigeria

Head Coach: Sanni Ahmed

Serbia and Montenegro

Head Coach: Dragan Šakota

Venezuela

Head Coach: Néstor Salazar

Group B

Angola
 
Head coach: Alberto de Carvalho

Germany

Head coach: Dirk Bauermann

Japan

Head coach:  Željko Pavličević

New Zealand

Head coach: Tab Baldwin

NB: Ben Hill was put on standby when Mark Dickel tested positive for cannabis after a July match against Australia. However his suspension did not rule him out from any Championship games.

Panama

Head coach: Guillermo Vecchio

Spain

Head coach: Pepu Hernández

Group C

Australia

Head coach: Brian Goorjian

Brazil

Head coach: Lula Ferreira

Greece

Head coach: Panagiotis Giannakis

Lithuania

Head coach: Antanas Sireika

Qatar

Head Coach: Joseph Stiebing

Turkey

Head coach: Bogdan Tanjević

Group D

China

Head coach: Jonas Kazlauskas

NB: Age discrepancies exist for at least two of these players. Yi's age is currently a subject of controversy, with several reports indicating that he was actually born in 1984. Wang Zhizhi's passport lists his year of birth as 1979, but the NBA, where he played for several years, lists him as having been born in 1977.

Italy

Head coach: Carlo Recalcati

Puerto Rico

Head coach: Julio Toro

Senegal
 
Head coach: Moustapha Gaye

Slovenia

Head coach: Aleš Pipan

United States

Head coach: Mike Krzyzewski

External links
 
 

squads
FIBA Basketball World Cup squads